The 2005 Louisiana Tech Bulldogs football team represented Louisiana Tech University as a member of the Western Athletic Conference (WAC) during the 2005 NCAA Division I-A football season. Led by seventh-year head coach Jack Bicknell Jr., the Bulldogs played their home games at Joe Aillet Stadium in Ruston, Louisiana. Louisiana Tech finished the season with a record of 7–4 overall and a mark of 6–2 in conference play, tying for third place in the WAC.

Schedule

References

Louisiana Tec
Louisiana Tech Bulldogs football seasons
Louisiana Tech Bulldogs football